'Twixt, a contraction of betwixt, an archaic term for between, could refer to:

 TwixT, a 1960s board game
 Twixt animation system, a 1984 3D computer animation system
 Twixt (film), a 2011 horror thriller film
 Twixt Love and Fire, a 1914 short comedy film featuring Fatty Arbuckle
 Twixt Stakes, an American thoroughbred horse race
 "'Twixt Twelve and Twenty", a song by Pat Boone, 1959
 Twixt Twelve and Twenty (book), a book by Pat Boone which offered advice to teenagers

Other uses
 There's many a slip 'twixt the cup and the lip, a proverb

See also
 Twixteen
 Twixter
 Twixters (TV series)